Brian K. McHale (born December 9, 1954) is an American politician who represented the 46th legislative district in the Maryland House of Delegates.

Background

Brian McHale was born in Baltimore, Maryland on December 9, 1954. He attended Cardinal Gibbons High School, the Community College of Baltimore, Catonsville Community College and Loyola College. He works as a steamship clerk and is a member of Local 953, International Longshoremen's Association.

In the legislature

A member of House of Delegates since February 5, 1990, Delegate McHale is also the Assistant Majority Whip on the House floor. As a member of the House Economic Matters Committee, he serves on its alcoholic beverages work group and is chairman of its public utilities work group.

Legislative notes
Co-sponsored HB 860 (Baltimore City Public Schools Construction and Revitalization Act of 2013). Signed by the Governor on May 16, 2013, the new law approved 1.1 billion dollars to construct new schools in Baltimore City.
 voted for the Clean Indoor Air Act of 2007 (HB359)
 voted for the Healthy Air Act in 2006 (SB154)
 voted for slots in 2005 (HB1361)
 voted against electric deregulation in 1999 (HB703)
 voted for income tax reduction in 1998 (SB750)

General election results, 2006
2006 Race for Maryland House of Delegates – 46th District
Voters to choose three:
{| class="wikitable"
|-
!Name
!Votes
!Percent
!Outcome
|-
|-
|Peter A. Hammen, Dem.
|15,883
|  29.6%
|   Won
|-
|-
|Carolyn J. Krysiak, Dem.
|15,856
|  29.6%
|   Won
|-
|-
|Brian K. McHale, Dem.
|13,921
|  29.0%
|   Won
|-
|-
|Peter Kimos, Rep.
|6,219
|  11.6%
|   Lost
|-
|Other Write-Ins 
|154
|  0.3%
|   
|-
|}

References

Democratic Party members of the Maryland House of Delegates
Politicians from Baltimore
1966 births
Living people
21st-century American politicians